Raúl Adolfo Antuña (born 31 August 1973) is an Argentine former footballer who played for clubs from Argentina, Chile, Ecuador and Spain.

References
 
 Raúl Antuña at Fútbol XXI 

1973 births
Living people
Argentine footballers
Argentine expatriate footballers
Elche CF players
C.S.D. Macará footballers
C.D. Olmedo footballers
Instituto footballers
S.D. Aucas footballers
Deportes La Serena footballers
S.D. Quito footballers
C.D. Cuenca footballers
Unión de Santa Fe footballers
San Martín de Mendoza footballers
San Martín de San Juan footballers
Independiente Rivadavia footballers
Gimnasia y Tiro footballers
Gimnasia y Esgrima de Jujuy footballers
Chilean Primera División players
Argentine Primera División players
Expatriate footballers in Chile
Expatriate footballers in Spain
Expatriate footballers in Ecuador
Association football midfielders
People from San Juan, Argentina
Sportspeople from San Juan Province, Argentina
Argentine expatriate sportspeople in Chile
Argentine expatriate sportspeople in Ecuador
Argentine expatriate sportspeople in Spain
San Martín de San Juan managers